Nikolai Grigoryevich Tsyganov (Николай Григорьевич Цыганов, 1797, Saint Petersburg, Russian Empire, — 12 December 1832, Moscow, Russian Empire) was a Russian poet, singer and actor. An avid musical folklore collector, Tsyganov became known as an author and performer of his own songs, mostly variations of the traditional ones, some of which (like the well-known "Ne shei ty mne matushka krasny sarafan") later came to be regarded as bona fide Russian folk songs. The Russian Songs by N.Tsyganov, compiled by the author, came out posthumously, in 1834, to much critical acclaim.

References

External links 
 The works by Nikolai Tsyganov at the Moshkov Library (lib.ru)

Russian male poets
1797 births
1832 deaths